The African-American Film Critics Association Awards 2008, honoring the best in filmmaking of 2008, were given on December 19, 2008.

Top 10 Films
 The Dark Knight
 Slumdog Millionaire
 The Curious Case of Benjamin Button
 The Secret Life of Bees
 Cadillac Records
 Miracle at St. Anna
 Milk
 Seven Pounds
 Doubt
 Iron Man

Winners
Best Actor:
Frank Langella – Frost/Nixon
Best Actress:
Angelina Jolie – Changeling
Best Director:
Danny Boyle – Slumdog Millionaire
Best Picture:
The Dark Knight
Best Supporting Actor:
Heath Ledger – The Dark Knight posthumously
Best Supporting Actress:
Viola Davis – Doubt

References 

 http://www.blackfilm.com/20081218/features/aafcanews.shtml

2008 film awards
African-American Film Critics Association Awards